

As a name

Feminine given name

Royal name

Placename 
In Antarctica:
 Queen Maud Land, an area of 2.5 million square kilometers (1 million sq. mi.) claimed by Norway in 1938
In Canada:
 Queen Maud Gulf, Nunavut, Canada
In New Zealand:
 Maud Island, the second largest island in the Marlborough Sounds
In Scotland:
 Maud, Aberdeenshire, a small town in the Buchan area of the county of Aberdeenshire
In the United States:
 Maud, Illinois, an unincorporated community in Wabash County
 Maud, Iowa, an unincorporated community in Allamakee County
 Maud, Missouri, an unincorporated community
 Maud, Oklahoma, a city in Pottawatomie County
 Maud, Texas, a city in Bowie County
 Maud, Washington, an unincorporated community

Ship name 
 HNoMS Maud, a replenishment ship of the Royal Norwegian Navy, currently being fitted out
 Maud, a ship used from 1918 to 1925 by Norwegian explorer Roald Amundsen in exploring the Northeast Passage (now known as the Northern Sea Route)
 Maud, a Norfolk wherry built in 1899
 SS Dronning Maud, a Norwegian Hurtigruten ship sunk under controversial circumstances by German bombers during the 1940 Norwegian Campaign
 SS Princess Maud (1902), a passenger/cargo steamship torpedoed in 1918
 TSS Princess Maud (1934), a ferry generally plying the Irish Sea but also a troopship in the Second World War
 , a United States Navy patrol boat in commission from 1917 to 1919

In literature 
 Maud and other poems, an 1855 volume of poetry by English poet Alfred, Lord Tennyson
 "Maud" (poem), title poem in the 1855 volume by Alfred, Lord Tennyson
 Maud, a werecat in the Inheritance Cycle

Other uses 
Maud may also refer to:
 Maud (plaid), a black and white checked plaid once worn in southern Scotland and northern England
 MAUD Committee, the beginning of the British atomic bomb project, before the United Kingdom joined forces with the United States in the Manhattan Project
 MAUD Program, a program for analysis of materials using diffraction, based on the Rietveld refinement method

See also 
 Matilda (disambiguation)

Feminine given names
English given names

br:Maud
fr:Mathilde